The murder of Davis Timmerman occurred on September 17, 1941, in Edgefield County, South Carolina. Initially, there were no suspects, and police suspected that the murder was committed by a stranger who ambushed Timmerman in his store. However, a two-month investigation led to the arrests of Clarence Bagwell, George Logue, Logue's sister-in-law Sue Stidham Logue, and Sue's nephew Joe Frank Logue, who were accused of committing Timmerman's murder in retaliation for the self-defense shooting of George Logue's brother and Sue Logue's husband, John Wallace Logue. Timmerman was acquitted of John Wallace Logue's murder the prior year. Additionally, George and Sue Logue's arrests resulted in the deaths of three men, two law enforcement officers and a civilian, as George Logue engaged in a gun battle with the people who attempted to arrest them.

Timmerman's murder, and the ensuing trials of the three suspects, garnered significant press, especially within South Carolina; much of the retrospective attention around this case has centered around Sue Logue's personal life, as she was one of Strom Thurmond's lovers. All four suspects were convicted of Timmerman's murder and sentenced to death, and three – George Logue, Sue Logue, and Clarence Bagwell – were executed on January 15, 1943. Sue Logue's execution made her the first woman to be put to death in South Carolina's electric chair.

After the executions, George and Sue Logue's nephew, Joe Frank Logue, was tried, convicted, and sentenced to death for his involvement in Timmerman's murder. An hour before his scheduled execution, after having undergone the preparations for an electrocution, Joe Frank Logue received a commutation.

Background

Involved parties' early lives 
Davis Way Timmerman was born on April 18, 1899, in Edgefield County. Before his death, Timmerman owned a filling station and was reportedly wealthy; his family was considered "very prominent" in their area. He was married to a woman named Cornelia (née Watson).

Sue Belle Stidham was born in Saluda County, South Carolina, in April 1899. When she was eleven years old, her mother died.

John Wallace Logue was born in Edgefield County on December 13, 1896. John Wallace and Sue Logue were already married by the time he was drafted to serve in the United States military during World War I. They had one child, a daughter born on December 27, 1930; the infant, who was born prematurely, died three hours after birth.

Joseph Frank Logue, Jr. was born on September 11, 1908, in the town of Edgefield, South Carolina. On September 26, 1924, shortly after he turned 16, his father died, after which his aunt and uncles, Sue, John Wallace, and George Logue, helped raise him. Being raised by this group made Joe Frank feel indebted and loyal to them. By the time of Timmerman's murder, Joseph Frank Logue was married and worked as a police officer in Spartanburg, South Carolina.

By 1940, the Logues lived in a farmhouse with John Wallace's mother and his brother, George Logue, who was unmarried. The Logues' farmhouse was located close to Timmerman's. For several years leading up to 1940, when tensions reached a head with J. Wallace Logue's death, the Logues and the Timmerman family had a long-standing feud.

Death of John Wallace Logue and acquittal of Davis Timmerman 
In September 1940, one of Timmerman's mules wandered into a field belonging to J. Wallace Logue. Timmerman's mule kicked one of Logue's calves to death. Logue requested $20 as compensation for the dead calf, and Timmerman agreed to pay it. On September 30, upon visiting Timmerman's filling station to request the money, Logue doubled his request to $40, and Timmerman refused to pay, after which Logue began attacking Timmerman with an axe. Timmerman retrieved a gun from a drawer and shot Logue twice, killing him. A badly-injured Timmerman drove to the town of Edgefield, South Carolina, to report the killing to the local sheriff.

After the sheriff, county coroner, and solicitor reviewed the scene of Logue's death at Timmerman's store, Timmerman was arrested and charged with Logue's murder. Between Timmerman's arrest and trial, Logue's widow Sue and her brother-in-law, George Logue, invited Joe Frank their house repeatedly. Joe Frank would drive several hours to get to Edgefield County; during these visits, as Joe Frank would later tell police, both Sue and George Logue repeatedly expressed a desire to avenge John Wallace's death by killing Timmerman. Joe Frank reported specifically hearing Sue Logue saying, "I will kill Davis Timmerman or see that he is killed."

At trial in March 1941, Timmerman argued that he shot Logue in self-defense. The jury accepted his argument and acquitted him of Logue's murder. Witnesses at the trial reported that when Logue's widow, Sue Logue, heard the verdict being read, she again vowed to avenge her husband's death.

Murder of Davis Timmerman 
Between March and July 1941, Sue, George, and Joe Frank Logue visited Fred Dorn, a sharecropper who worked on the Logues' farm, to propose the idea of murdering Timmerman. Weeks later, an African American man who was one of Timmerman's hired hands was shot to death with a rifle; although the murder was never prosecuted or solved, locals suspected the Logues, specifically George Logue, and Fred Dorn were involved.

In July 1941, Sue and George Logue visited Joe Frank in Spartanburg. During this visit, Sue gave Joe Frank US$500 under the condition that Joe Frank would find someone to kill Timmerman. When Joe Frank resisted, Sue allegedly told him that Fred Dorn had been unable to kill Timmerman and started threatening Joe Frank that "something will happen to your mother and your wife" if he did not cooperate. Days later, Joe Frank met with Clarence Bagwell, a 34-year-old painter and known criminal from Spartanburg, and proposed the idea of murdering Timmerman; during another meeting one week later, Bagwell agreed to shoot Timmerman under the condition that Joe Frank Logue pay him $500.

On September 16, 1941, Joe Frank Logue purchased the murder weapon from a pawn shop and gave it to Clarence Bagwell. On September 17, 1941, Logue and Bagwell cased out Timmerman's store, during which Bagwell encountered Timmerman's wife Cornelia. At approximately 7:00 pm that same day, Logue and Bagwell returned to Timmerman's store. Logue remained in the car while Bagwell entered the store. Bagwell requested either a pack of gum or cigarettes; when Timmerman turned his back to Bagwell, Bagwell murdered him by shooting him four or five times point-blank with a .38 caliber revolver. Witnesses observed a "stranger" fleeing from the area in a car around the time of Timmerman's murder. Timmerman's body was discovered by his wife, who heard gunshots coming from the vicinity of the store and rushed over to investigate. After the murder, George and Sue Logue paid Bagwell $500.

Arrests and gunfight 
Following Timmerman's murder, authorities offered a monetary reward for any information surrounding it, as they had no viable leads.

In October 1941, two natives of Augusta, Georgia, named Jesse L. James and Jimmie Kitchen, both of whom were in their 20s, were wrongfully arrested in Fort Smith, Arkansas for the murder of Davis Timmerman. Edgefield County Sheriff Wad D. Allen, who was a cousin of George and Sue Logue, transported the men to Edgefield, although he refused to provide information explaining why he thought James and Kitchen were involved in Timmerman's murder. Allen also filed murder charges against James.

In mid-November 1941, Bagwell either got into an argument with his girlfriend, or drunkenly told her that he was involved in a murder; afterwards, his girlfriend went to the police station and reported that Bagwell was the actual culprit behind Timmerman's murder. Bagwell was promptly arrested, after which Timmerman's widow identified him as the man she had seen casing out the store the day before. Her identification led to Bagwell confessing to the murders; he implicated Joe Frank Logue in the murders as well, confessing that Logue had hired him, and one of Logue's colleagues reported that he had substituted for Logue on the night of the murders. After Bagwell's confession, Logue was arrested as well on November 9, although at the time, he denied any involvement in Timmerman's murder; nevertheless, the two were transported to the South Carolina Penitentiary for safekeeping.

Following the arrests of Logue and Bagwell, Jesse James and Jimmie Kitchen were exonerated and released from custody.

After consulting with his attorney, Joe Frank Logue decided to confess to his involvement in Timmerman's murder. His confession implicated George and Sue Logue as accessories to the murder.

Gunfight 
On November 16, 1941, Sheriff Allen, who was unarmed, approached the Logues' farmhouse alongside Sheriff William L. Clark, who was armed. The two intended to arrest the Logues, but as they entered the house, George Logue and Fred Dorn began shooting at them. Sheriff Allen died at the scene, while Sheriff Clark fired from his own gun, injuring George Logue and fatally wounding Fred Dorn, who was pronounced dead six hours later after being transported to a hospital. Allen was rushed to a hospital in Augusta, Georgia, where he died on November 18.

After the deaths of Allen and Clark, a lynch mob formed, threatening extrajudicial violence against Sue and George Logue. Local judge Strom Thurmond, who was having an affair with Sue Logue at the time, approached the Logues' farm, which, at the time, was surrounded by armed citizens. Thurmond convinced the group to let him through so he could negotiate with Sue and George Logue; he then convinced the two to surrender and turn themselves in. Clarence Bagwell and Sue and George Logue were then transported to the South Carolina Penitentiary.

Perpetrators' trials and executions 
In early January 1942, the attorneys representing the Logues and Bagwell announced their intentions to motion for a change of venue.

The trials for George Logue, Sue Logue, and Clarence Bagwell took place in 1942 over the course of three days. The change of venue was granted, causing the trial to take place in Lexington County, South Carolina. Their jury only deliberated for two hours before returning guilty verdicts and sentencing all three to death.

Executions 
Years after the executions took place, Randall Johnson, a driver who worked at the State House, transported Strom Thurmond to the women's penitentiary, where Sue Logue was being held as she awaited her execution. Thurmond had volunteered to personally transport her to the South Carolina Penitentiary where her execution would take place. Johnson later attested that Thurmond and Logue spent the trip having sexual relations in the back of the car.

On January 15, 1943, Sue Logue, George Logue, and Clarence Bagwell were executed in South Carolina's electric chair, in that order. The executions took place at approximately 7:00 am. Sue Logue's execution made her the first woman, albeit not the only one, to be executed in South Carolina's electric chair.

Aftermath 
Following the executions of Clarence Bagwell and Sue and George Logue, Bagwell's body was transported to a funeral home, after which his family had him buried in Spartanburg's Oakwood Cemetery.

Joe Frank Logue went on trial after the executions of his co-conspirators had been completed. He was convicted, found guilty, and sentenced to death. His execution was scheduled to take place on January 23, 1944. However, after Logue had eaten his last meal and otherwise been prepared for execution, Governor Johnston visited Logue on death row and spoke to him. His visit convinced Johnston to commute Joe Frank Logue's sentence to life imprisonment.

After his commutation, Logue worked in prison training and handling bloodhounds. He was released on parole in 1960 after 37 out of 40 South Carolina state sheriffs advocated for his release.

References 

1941 in South Carolina
1941 murders in the United States
Murder-for-hire cases
Strom Thurmond